The list of ship decommissionings in 1977 includes a chronological list of all ships decommissioned in 1977.


See also 

1977
 Ship decommissionings
Ship